The Death of Lau Yew took place at the beginning of the Malayan Emergency. British security forces clashed with those of the Malayan Communist Party resulting in the death of one of their key leaders, Lau Yew. He had been betrayed by his own bodyguard.

Six people were killed in the initial attack. Five Chinese women who had been captured by the British were then killed when 30 Communists counter-attacked.

References

External links

Malayan Emergency
Violent deaths in Malaysia
1948 in Malaya
Kajang
July 1948 events in Asia